Bárbara Gabriela Romo Fonseca (born 5 November 1977) is a Mexican politician affiliated with the PVEM. As of 2013 she served as Deputy of the LXII Legislature of the Mexican Congress representing Zacatecas.

References

1977 births
Living people
Politicians from Zacatecas City
Women members of the Chamber of Deputies (Mexico)
Members of the Chamber of Deputies (Mexico)
Ecologist Green Party of Mexico politicians
21st-century Mexican politicians
21st-century Mexican women politicians
Autonomous University of Zacatecas alumni